Mount Giluwe Rural LLG is a local-level government (LLG) of Western Highlands Province, Papua New Guinea. Mount Giluwe is located within the LLG.

Wards
01. Gihamu 1
02. Gihamu 2
03. Muga
04. Paiakona.1
05. Paiakona.2
06. Toroika
07. Kamunga 1
08. Kamunga 2
09. Tomba
10. Tsingibai.1
11. Tsingibai.3
12. Tsingibai 2
13. Tsingibai 4
14. Karapangi
15. Pulgumong
16. Kikuwa
17. Pommboli
18. Kumbaipulg
19. Maltaka
20. Kamindi
21. Pagapena 1
22. Pagapena.2
23. Pagapena 3
24. Oiapulg. 1
25. Oiapugl.2
26. Awabo
27. Laiagam 1
28. Laiagam 2
29. Malke 1
30. Malke 2
31. Kagop 1
32. Kagop 2
33. Kagop 3
34. Alkena 1
35. Alkena 2
36. Alkena.3
37. Iapauga
38. Wambul 1
39. Wambul 2
40. Kopine
41. Bonga.1
42. Bonga.2
43. Koroka
44. Kerepia.1
45. Kerepia.2
46. Kerepia.3
47. Tamal
48. Palnol
49. Gia.1
50. Gia.2
51. Kombolga
52. Marapugl

References

Local-level governments of Western Highlands Province